Monte Naranco is a mountain in Oviedo, Spain. The church Santa María del Naranco is situated on its slopes. It is also known as the finishing line for the bicycle races Subida al Naranco and Vuelta a España.

Mountains of Asturias